Huddersfield Town's 1977–78 campaign is statistically Huddersfield Town's worst season since entering the Football League in  1910. Town finished 11th in the 4th Division. Under John Haselden and then Tom Johnston Town would stay in the 4th Division for a fourth successive season.

Squad at the start of the season

Review
After two seasons in the basement division of the Football League, some Town fans were wondering if Town were ever going to get back into at least the Third Division. Town reverted to their blue and white striped kit, after two years in the all-blue kit. But, at the start of the season, it seemed to be a curse, with Town winning none of their first eight matches, which unsurprisingly saw John Haselden get demoted to coach, which saw Tom Johnston return to the hotseat at Leeds Road for a record third time. Town went on a six match unbeaten run, but then Town seemed to go for the rest on the season in a complete mix of mediocrity.

Town's top scorers for the season were Mick Butler on 19 goals, Terry Gray on 11 and then Kevin Johnson on 10. By the end of the season, both Butler and Johnson left Leeds Road for pastures new. Town finished 11th with just 45 points, finishing only four points above Halifax Town, who were in 20th place.

Squad at the end of the season

Results

Division Four

FA Cup

Football League Cup

Appearances and goals

1977-78
English football clubs 1977–78 season